Mónika Show was a Hungarian talk show aired on RTL Klub every weekday from 2001 to 2010. The host was Mónika Erdélyi.

About

The main point was to let ordinary people go to this show in order to share their stories with the viewers. Mónika's role was to lead the conversations by giving equal opportunities to her guests for answering her questions. Sometimes the guests did not know about the topic itself so they had to face it in front of the audience.

Rating

Originally, the rating was 12. Later on, they changed it to 16. There were some episodes when they had to put 18 restriction (the red circle).

The commercial channel RTL Klub had several confrontations with the ORTT.

References

RTL Klub - Mónika Show
Port.hu - Mónika - a kibeszélőshow
Wikipedia - Erdélyi Maunika
Wikipedia - Mónika Show
ORTT

2001 Hungarian television series debuts
2010 Hungarian television series endings
2000s Hungarian television series
2010s Hungarian television series
RTL (Hungarian TV channel) original programming